Masked & Anonymous: Music from the Motion Picture is a 2003 soundtrack album by various artists performing songs by Bob Dylan, apart from Bob Dylan himself, who performs not only his own, but also some classic folk songs.

Track listing
All songs by Bob Dylan, except where noted:

"My Back Pages" - The Magokoro Brothers
"Gotta Serve Somebody" - Shirley Caesar
"Down in the Flood" - Bob Dylan
"It's All Over Now, Baby Blue" - The Grateful Dead
 "Most of the Time" - Sophie Zelmani
 "On a Night Like This" - Los Lobos
"Diamond Joe" - Bob Dylan (Jack Elliot)
 "Come Una Pietra Scalciata" (Like a Rolling Stone)  - Articolo 31
 "One More Cup of Coffee" - Sertab
 "Non Dirle Che Non E' Cosi'" (If You See Her, Say Hello)'' - Francesco de Gregori
 "Dixie" - Bob Dylan (Dan Emmett)
"Señor (Tales of Yankee Power)" - Jerry Garcia	
 "Cold Irons Bound" - Bob Dylan
 "City of Gold" - The Dixie Hummingbirds

2003 soundtrack albums
Drama film soundtracks